Oarces reticulatus is a spider species in the family Araneidae.

It is endemic to Chile and adjacent Argentina, where it is widespread.

References

 Platnick, N.I. & Shabad, M.U. (1993). A review of the pirate spiders (Araneae, Mimetidae) of Chile. American Museum Novitates 3074. Abstract - PDF (12Mb) (with drawings and micrographs of O. reticulatus)

Araneidae
Spiders of South America
Spiders described in 1849